This is a list of shopping malls in Bulgaria. Currently 32 malls are active in the country.

Sofia
 Paradise Center (2013) (GLA 80,000 m2) 
 Sofia Ring Mall (2014) (GLA 69,000 m2)
 The Mall (2010) (GLA 62,000 m2) 
 Serdika Center Sofia  (2010) (GLA 51,000 m2) 
 Mall of Sofia (2006) (GLA 35,000 m2)
 Bulgaria Mall (2012) (GLA 33,000 m2) 
 Mega Mall Sofia (2014) (GLA 24,000 m2)
 Park Center Sofia (former City Center Sofia) (2006) (GLA 22,000 m2)
 Central Department Store (TZUM) (1955) (renovated in 2000) (GLA 19,000 m2)  
 Sofia Outlet Center  (2010) (GLA 15,300 m2)
 Sky City Mall (2006) (GLA 15,000 m2)
 Princess Outlet Center (2007) (GLA 12,000 m2)

Under construction
 Plaza West Sofia (under construction) (2015) (GLA 37,750 m2)

Projected
 Canyon Trade Center (project) (2016) (GLA 32,000 m2)

Plovdiv
 Mall Plovdiv Plaza (former Galeria Plovdiv) (2010) (GLA 35,000 m2) 
 Mall Plovdiv (2009) (GLA 22,000 m2) 
 Markovo Tepe Mall (2016) (GLA 21,000 m2)

Under Construction
 Mall Promenada (2018) (GLA 57,700 m2)

Project
 Mall Maritza  (U/C) (project)

Varna
 Grand Mall (2010) (GLA 52,000 m2) 
 Mall Varna (2008) (GLA 33,000 m2)
 Delta Planet Mall (2019) (GLA 40,000 m2)
 Varna Towers (2010) (GLA 52,000 m2)
 Pfohe Mall (2007) (GLA 22,000 m2)

Burgas
 Burgas Plaza Mall (2009) (GLA 33,000 m2) 
 Galleria Burgas (2012) (GLA 37,000 m2)

Proposed
 Sun City Centre (project)

Rousse
 Mall Rousse (2010) (GLA 36,000 m2)
 Mega Mall Ruse (2010) (GLA 17,800 m2)

Proposed
 Danube Mall (T/O) (GLA 31,000 m2) 
 Galleria Ruse (project) (GLA 43,000 m2)
 Grand Plaza (proposed) (GLA 37,500 m2)

Stara Zagora
 Carrefour City Mall (2013) (GLA 20,900 m2) 
 City Center Stara Zagora (CCSZ) (2011) (GLA 16,000 m2)
 Galleria Stara Zagora (2010) (GLA 26,000 m2) 
 Park Mall Stara Zagora (2008) (GLA 22,000 m2)
 Department Store Stara Zagora (1977) (GLA 18,500 m2)

Proposed
 Mall Stara Zagora - RESB (on hold)

Pleven
 Central Mall Pleven (2007) (GLA 10,000 m2) 
 Mall Panorama (2014) (GLA 22,000 m2) 
 Mania Tower (City Center Pleven)
 Maxi Trade Center (2008) (GLA 6,000 m2)

Shumen
Cancelled
 Shumen Plaza Shopping Center (project) (2006-2013) (GLA 20,000 m2)

Haskovo
Proposed
 Mall of Haskovo (proposed)

Blagoevgrad
Project
 City Mall (project)  (21,000 m2) 
 Focus Mall (project) (GLA 50,000 m2)

Veliko Tarnovo
 Mall Veliko Tarnovo (2006) (GLA 33,000 m2)

Gabrovo
 Mall Gabrovo  (2010) (GLA 16,000 m2)
 Terra Mall  (2009) (GLA 10,000 m2)

Sliven
 S Mall Sliven (2015)
City Center Sliven (2013)

Silistra
 S&S Mall (2009)

Samokov
 Mall Samokov

Sandanski
 Sandanski Mall

Sunny Beach
 Royal Beach Mall (2007)

References

Bulgaria
Shopping malls